Sartha was a genus of moths of the family Noctuidae. It is now considered a synonym of Hecatera.

References
Natural History Museum Lepidoptera genus database

Hadeninae